The Naka-Meguro train disaster occurred in Japan on 8 March 2000. Five people were killed and 63 were injured when a derailed TRTA Hibiya Line train was sideswiped by a second train near Naka-Meguro Station.

Accident 

Factors 
It is generally the case that if the distance between tracks is less than the width of the carriages this only allows about 600 mm clearance, so that if a train derails on the same side as the other track, it will almost certainly obstruct the other track, making a collision inevitable. Track circuits detect the presence of a train via electric current passed through the rails, which is shorted by a train car's axle or a physical break in the rails. If a derailment on an adjacent track, that doesn't cause a physical break in the other track, won't cause the track circuit to 'short' resulting in a stop signal. In this situation, a train crew member must either warn railway signal staff of the derailment, stop other trains using a handheld signal, such as a red flag, or manually short the track circuit using a specialized equipment, such as a track circuit operating clip.

See also 
 List of rail accidents (2000–2009)

Similar accidents
1995 Ais Gill rail accident - A 1995 UK railway accident, where a landslide derailed one train across both tracks of a double track route, which was then struck a train on the other track, heading the opposite direction.
 Big Bayou Canot rail accident - 1993 USA railway accident, where a train derailed at a bridge struck by a ship. The rails were forced out of alignment, but did not separate, which resulted in the track circuit not indicate a track fault.

References 

 Failure Knowledge Database 日比谷線の列車脱線衝突 Retrieved on 27 August 2008 

Derailments in Japan
Railway accidents in 2000
2000 in Japan
Tokyo Metro Hibiya Line
March 2000 events in Japan
2000 disasters in Japan